Xanthobacter tagetidis is a bacterium from the family of Xanthobacteraceae which has been isolated from soil from Root balls around the plant Tagetes patula in the United Kingdom. Xanthobacter tagetidis has the ability to grow on substituted thiophenes.

References

Further reading

External links
Type strain of Xanthobacter tagetidis at BacDive -  the Bacterial Diversity Metadatabase

Hyphomicrobiales
Bacteria described in 1997